James Philip McKiernan (11 October 1944 – 10 August 2018) was an Irish-born Australian politician. Born in Cavan, Ireland, he was a fitter and turner before entering politics. In Australia he was a union education officer for the Australian Manufacturing Workers' Union. In 1984, he was elected to the Australian Senate as a Labor Senator for Western Australia. A one-time convenor of the Left faction, McKiernan was the Labor Caucus' returning officer for the Hawke versus Keating leadership ballot. He remained in the Senate until his retirement in 2002. He was married to Western Australian state MP Jackie Watkins from 1985.

References

1944 births
2018 deaths
Australian Labor Party members of the Parliament of Australia
Members of the Australian Senate for Western Australia
Members of the Australian Senate
21st-century Australian politicians
20th-century Australian politicians
Irish emigrants to Australia
People from County Cavan
Deaths from cancer in Western Australia